The 2015 Men's EuroHockey Championship III was the sixth edition of the Men's EuroHockey Championship III, the third level of the European field hockey championships organized by the European Hockey Federation.

It was held from 19 until 25 July 2015 in Lisbon, Portugal. The winner and runner-up of this tournament were promoted to the 2017 EuroHockey Championship II.

Qualified teams

Format
The six teams were split into two groups of three teams. The top two teams advanced to the semi-finals to determine the winner in a knockout system. The bottom two teams played against each other to determine the 5th and 6th place teams.

Results
''All times are local (UTC+2).

Preliminary round

Pool A

Pool B

Fifth to sixth place classification

First to fourth place classification

Semi-finals

Third place game

Final

Final standings

 Promoted to the EuroHockey Championship II

See also
2015 Men's EuroHockey Championship II
2015 Men's EuroHockey Championship IV
2015 Women's EuroHockey Championship III

References

EuroHockey Championship III
Men 3
EuroHockey Championship III Men
International field hockey competitions hosted by Portugal
Sports competitions in Lisbon
2010s in Lisbon
EuroHockey Championship III Men